Edward Neil Anthony Hannon (born 7 November 1970) is a Northern Irish singer and songwriter.  He is the creator and front man of the chamber pop group The Divine Comedy, and is the band's sole constant member.  Hannon wrote the theme tunes for the television sitcoms Father Ted and The IT Crowd.

Early life and education
Hannon was born in Derry, Northern Ireland, the son of Brian Hannon, a Church of Ireland minister in the Diocese of Derry and Raphoe and later Bishop of Clogher. He spent some of his youth in Fivemiletown before moving with his family to Enniskillen, in County Fermanagh, in 1982. While there, he attended Portora Royal School.

Hannon enjoyed synthesizer-based music as a youngster; he has identified the Human League and Orchestral Manoeuvres in the Dark (OMD) as "the first music that really excited [him]". In the late 1980s he developed a fondness of the electric guitar, becoming an "indie kid".

Career
Hannon is founder and mainstay of The Divine Comedy, a band which achieved their biggest commercial success in the mid- to late-1990s with the albums Casanova (1996), A Short Album About Love (1997), and Fin de Siècle (1998).  Hannon continues to release albums under The Divine Comedy name, the most recent being Office Politics (2019). In 2000 he and Joby Talbot contributed four tracks for Ute Lemper's collaboration album, Punishing Kiss.

In 2004 he played alongside the Ulster Orchestra for the opening event of the Belfast Festival at Queen's. In 2005, he contributed vocals to his long-time collaborator Joby Talbot's soundtrack for the movie version of The Hitchhiker's Guide to the Galaxy.

In 2006 it was announced that Hannon was to lend his vocal ability to the Doctor Who soundtrack CD release, recording two songs – "Love Don't Roam" for the 2006 Christmas special, "The Runaway Bride", and a new version of "Song For Ten", originally used in 2005's "The Christmas Invasion". On 12 January 2007, The Guardian website's "Media Monkey" diary column reported that Doctor Who fans from the discussion forum on the fan website Outpost Gallifrey were attempting to organise mass downloads of the Hannon-sung "Love Don't Roam", which was available as a single release on the UK iTunes Store. This was in order to attempt to exploit the new UK Singles Chart download rules, and get the song featured in the Top 40 releases.

The same year Hannon added his writing and vocal talents to the Air album Pocket Symphony, released in the United States on 6 March 2007. He is featured on the track "Somewhere Between Waking and Sleeping", for which he wrote the lyrics. This song had been originally written for and sung by Charlotte Gainsbourg on her album, 5:55. Though it was not included in its 2006 European release, it was added as a bonus track for its American release on 24 April 2007.

Hannon won the 2007 Choice Music Prize for his 2006 album, Victory for the Comic Muse. It was announced the following day that he had left EMI by 'mutual consent'. In 2015 he won the 2015 Legend Award from the Oh Yeah organisation in Belfast.

When the band Keane played at the O2 Arena in London in July, "A Bad Dream" was introduced by Hannon. He introduced it by reading the poem "An Irish Airman Foresees His Death" by W. B. Yeats, upon which the song is based.

He is credited with composing the theme music for the sitcoms Father Ted and The IT Crowd, the former theme composed for the show and later reworked into "Songs of Love", a track on The Divine Comedy's breakthrough album Casanova. Both shows were created or co-created by Graham Linehan. For the Father Ted episode, "A Song for Europe", Hannon co-wrote and sang "My Lovely Horse", the song Ted and Dougal enter in Eurosong (a parody of the Eurovision Song Contest). For the same episode, Hannon wrote "The Miracle Is Mine", the 'typical' Eurovision ballad sung by Ted's nemesis, Father Dick Byrne. A dream sequence in the episode shows Ted and Dougal in the song's pop video, with Hannon providing vocals. Hannon also wrote and performed "My Lovely Mayo Mammy", sung by Eoin McLove in the episode "Night of the Nearly Dead", and wrote "Big Men in Frocks", sung by Niamh Connolly in "Rock-a-Hula Ted". When a raffle is held in order to raise funds to repair the roof of the parochial house, the Kraftwerk-esque quartet of priests enlisted to perform play an electronic piece of music composed and performed by him. Both of the advertisements for telephone numbers; in The IT Crowd (the new emergency number) and Father Ted (Priest Chatback) have jingles composed by Hannon. In the episode "A Christmassy Ted", his name is mentioned by Mrs Doyle while she attempts to guess that of the mysterious guest. 

Hannon has also collaborated with Thomas Walsh, from the Irish band Pugwash, to create a cricket-themed pop album under the name The Duckworth Lewis Method. The first single, "The Age of Revolution", was released in June 2009, and a full-length album released the week after. The group's second album, Sticky Wickets, came out in 2013.

Hannon contributed to a musical version of Swallows and Amazons, writing the music while Helen Edmundson wrote the book and lyrics, which premiered in December 2010 at the Bristol Old Vic. A new Divine Comedy album, Bang Goes the Knighthood, was released in May 2010.

In April 2012 Hannon's first opera commission, Sevastopol, was performed by the Royal Opera House. It was part of a program called OperaShots, which invites musicians not typically working within the opera medium to create an opera. Sevastopol was based upon Leo Tolstoy's Sevastopol Sketches. Hannon's second opera (book by Frank Alva Buecheler, English by Tim Clarke) for which he wrote music, In May, premiered in May 2013 in Lancaster and was shown in 2014 with overwhelming success e.g. in Glasgow and Brighton.

The world premiere of To Our Fathers in Distress, in the words of the composer "a kind of oratorio" for chorus, strings and organ, was performed on 22 March 2014 at the Royal Festival Hall in London. It was inspired by Hannon's father, the Rt Rev Brian Hannon, who had suffered from Alzheimer's disease before his death in 2022.

Personal life
Since 2009, Hannon's partner is Irish musician Cathy Davey. The couple live in County Kildare. He was previously married to Orla Little, with whom he has a daughter, Willow Hannon. With Davey, Hannon is a patron of the Irish animal charity My Lovely Horse Rescue, named after the Father Ted Eurovision song for which he wrote the music.

Politically, Hannon describes himself as being "a thoroughly leftie, Guardian-reading chap, but of the champagne socialist variety".

Discography

The Divine Comedy

Fanfare for the Comic Muse (1990)
Liberation (1993)
Promenade (1994)
Casanova (1996)
A Short Album About Love (1997)
Fin de Siècle (1998)
A Secret History... The Best of the Divine Comedy (1999)
Regeneration (2001)
Absent Friends (2004)
Victory for the Comic Muse (2006)
Bang Goes the Knighthood (2010)
Foreverland (2016)
Office Politics (2019)
Venus, Cupid, Folly & Time (2020)

Other contributions
The Cake Sale (compilation) – "Aliens"
Doctor Who: Original Television Soundtrack (compilation) – "Song for Ten" (performer)
Doctor Who: Original Television Soundtrack (compilation) – "Love Don't Roam" (performer)
Amélie (compilation) – "Les Jours tristes" (instrumental version) (co-writer)
L'Absente by Yann Tiersen – "Les Jours tristes" (English version) (co-writer and performer)
The Hitchhiker's Guide to the Galaxy Soundtrack (compilation) – "So Long and Thanks for All the Fish" (performer)
Reload by Tom Jones – "All Mine" (as the Divine Comedy) (performer)
Pocket Symphony by Air – "Somewhere Between Waking and Sleeping" (writer and performer)
Songs from the Deep Forest by Duke Special – "Our Love Goes Deeper Than This" (performer)
Hyacinths and Thistles by the 6ths – "The Dead Only Quickly" (singer)
Eleven Modern Antiquities by Pugwash – "Take Me Away" (performer)
Punishing Kiss by Ute Lemper – (multiple tracks) (performer and writer)
Les piqûres d'araignée by Vincent Delerm – "Favourite Song" (duet track)
A Mãe by Rodrigo Leão – "Cathy" (performer)
God Help the Girl by God Help the Girl – "Perfection as a Hipster"; Neil Hannon with Catherine Ireton (performer)
"No Regrets" by Robbie Williams – backing vocals with Neil Tennant of Pet Shop Boys
The Silent World of Hector Mann by Duke Special – "Wanda, Darling of the Jockey Club"
Irrepetible by Coque Malla – duets on "My Beautiful Monster"
Adventure Man by  Eg – "Pay Later" (co-writer and performer) 
Adventure Man by  Eg – "If You Run" (co-writer and performer)

See also
The Duckworth Lewis Method
Tinsel and Marzipan

References

External links 
 Biography of Neil Hannon – part of the official Divine Comedy website
 
 

1970 births
Living people
Male singers from Northern Ireland
Songwriters from Northern Ireland
People educated at Portora Royal School
Musicians from Derry (city)
Baritones from Northern Ireland
The Divine Comedy (band) members
Pop singers from Northern Ireland
RTÉ 2fm presenters
Musical theatre composers from Northern Ireland
Film score composers from Northern Ireland
Singer-songwriters from Northern Ireland
Composers for pipe organ
British television composers
Male film score composers
Musicians from County Fermanagh